The Tata Magic is a Microvan launched by Tata Motors in June 2007.

Features
The Magic is the passenger version of the Ace mini-truck. The new Magic features an all-steel cabin. It offers a flexible seating capacity of 4-7 passengers with adequate legroom. The 12-inch tyres provide higher ground clearance, and the rigid front axle is designed to handle bumpy roads.

Emissions
The Magic meets BS-III emission norms and has been developed for use in the general Indian domestic market.

BS-VI Magic Express 

The TATA Magic Express 10 Seater is the newest addition to the Tata Magic Mini Vans. The new Tata Magic express meets BS-VI emission norms and has been developed for use in the general Indian domestic market by Tata Motors.

External links
 Tata Magic official website

References

2010s cars
Cars introduced in 2007
Microvans
Minivans
Magic